Lisleby is the largest of the cityparts in centrum Fredrikstad, Norway. Before 1963, Lisleby was a part Glemmen kommune.
Lisleby was a center of the Fredrikstad industry, and the first electric light used in Norway, was lit in Lisleby Bruk in 1877.

It had circa 3 400 inhabitants in 2017.

References

External links
Fredrikstad Kommune

Fredrikstad